Knud Geelmuyden Fleischer Maartmann (1821–1888) was a Norwegian politician.

Biografia 
He was elected to the Parliament of Norway in 1865, representing the urban constituency of Flekkefjord. He worked as a merchant in the city. He was re-elected in 1868, and thus served two terms.

Together with Kirstine Solberg he had the daughter Kaja Maartmann (1851–1933), who married Ellef Ringnes, brother of Amund Ringnes and founder of Ringnes Bryggeri. His son Harald Sigwart Maartmann (1855 - 1926) become the first director of Ringnes Bryggeri in 1901. He was the grandfather of Knud Maartmann Ringnes.

References

1821 births
1888 deaths
Members of the Storting
Vest-Agder politicians
Norwegian businesspeople
People from Flekkefjord